Michael Cores (1885 – June 12, 1934) was a violist.

Born in Kiev when it was part of the Russian Empire, Cores earned a Doctor of Natural Science degree from Kiev University and a doctorate from the University of Moscow. He worked as a lawyer before moving to the United States in 1923.

Cores studied music at the Moscow Imperial Conservatory under Jan Hřímalý. He played in the New York Philharmonic under Willem Mengelberg, the NBC Symphony Orchestra under Arturo Toscanini, and the Stringwood Ensemble, a chamber music ensemble.

Cores was the brother of violinist Alexander Cores and the father of novelist Lucy Cores.

References

1885 births
1934 deaths
Russian classical violists
Russian viola d'amore players
Taras Shevchenko National University of Kyiv alumni
Moscow State University alumni
Moscow Conservatory alumni
Emigrants from the Russian Empire to the United States
20th-century classical musicians
20th-century violists